Signalgrass is a common name for two closely related genera of grasses:

Brachiaria
Urochloa